The M60 motorway, Manchester Ring Motorway or Manchester Outer Ring Road is an orbital motorway in North West England. Built over a 40-year period, it passes through most of Greater Manchester's metropolitan boroughs except for Wigan and Bolton. Most of Manchester is encompassed within the motorway, except for the southernmost part of the city (Wythenshawe and Manchester Airport) which is served by the M56.

The road forms part of the unsigned Euroroutes E20 and E22 from junctions 12 to 18.

In 2008, the M60 was proposed as a cordon for congestion charging in Greater Manchester, although this was rejected in a referendum relating to the Greater Manchester Transport Innovation Fund.

History
The M60 was developed by connecting and consolidating the existing motorway sections of the M63, M62, and an extended M66. It came into existence as the M60 in 1998, followed by the completion of the eastern side (junctions 19–23) opening in October 2000.

The original plan called for a completely new motorway, but policy change led to the plan which created the current motorway. As soon as it opened, the motorway came close to its projected maximum volume on significant sections.

It is an orbital motorway, and in 2004, a section of the northern M60 was the UK's busiest stretch of road, with an average of 181,000 vehicles per day using the stretch between junctions 16 and 17. Usually, the western side of the M25 motorway holds that distinction, but the M25's figures at the time were lower than normal due to roadworks starting.

In 2006, the section between junctions 5 and 6 was widened from three to four lanes each way and the section between junctions 6 and 8 was widened from two to three lanes each way with an additional two-lane collector/distributor road on either side of the main carriageways. Access for junctions 6 to 8 is only from the collector/distributor road. Some of the junctions were extensively re-modelled. As part of the project, the A6144(M) motorway, which connected to the M60 at junction 8, was downgraded and lost its motorway status.

The Greater Manchester congestion charge which would have affected drivers only during peak times coming off the M60 towards Manchester was rejected by a referendum on 12 December 2008.

Work to upgrade two sections of the M60 to a managed motorway system had been planned to commence in 2013. This would have included a new lane from junction 12 to 15 and a new lane from junction 8 to 12 near the Trafford Centre. Both these projects were subsequently cancelled in favour of a new project that includes speed cameras on this section but no additional lane or hard-shoulder running. An 'environmental assessment' was cited as the reason an additional lane was not provided. A combined approach was initiated in 2014, comprising managed motorway system and lane gain scheme. Work commenced in July 2014, and the full stretch of smart motorway became fully operational on 31 July 2018.

There are no motorway service areas on the M60. The closest service area is at Birch Services on the M62 heading eastwards.

M60 genealogy

Legislation

Each motorway in England requires that a Statutory Instrument be published, detailing the route of the road, before it can be built. The dates given on these Statutory Instruments relate to when the document was published, and not when the road was built. Provided below is an incomplete list of the Statutory Instruments relating to the route of the M60.
 Statutory Instrument 1988 No. 1708: M66 Motorway (Manchester Ring Road, Denton to Middleton Section) and Connecting Roads Scheme 1988 S.I. 1988/1708
 Statutory Instrument 1988 No. 1728: M66 Motorway (Middleton to the Lancashire/Yorkshire Motorway (M62) Section) and Connecting Roads Scheme 1988 S.I. 1988/1728
 Statutory Instrument 1993 No. 363: M66 Motorway (Manchester Outer Ring Road, Denton to Middleton Section) A663 Broadway All-Purpose Connecting Road Order 1993 S.I. 1993/363
 Statutory Instrument 1993 No. 364: M66 Motorway (Manchester Outer Ring Road, Denton to Middleton Section) and Connecting Roads Scheme 1988 Amendment Scheme 1993 S.I. 1993/364
 Statutory Instrument 1999 No. 2724: The M60 Motorway (Improvement Between Junctions 5 and 8) Connecting Roads Scheme 1999 S.I. 1999/2724
 Statutory Instrument 2002 No. 2403: The M60 Motorway (Junction 25) (Speed Limit) Regulations 2002 S.I. 2002/2403

Junctions
The recommended junction spacing for motorways is every .
{| class="plainrowheaders wikitable"
|-
!scope=col|Ceremonialcounty
!scope=col|Location
!scope=col|mi
!scope=col|km
!scope=col|Junction
!scope=col|Destinations
!scope=col|Notes
|-
|rowspan="28"|Greater Manchester
|Stockport
|0
|0
|1
| - Stockport
|
|-
|rowspan="2"|Cheadle
|1.5
|2.4
| bgcolor="ffdddd" |2
| bgcolor="ffdddd" | - Cheadle
| bgcolor="ffdddd" |No Eastbound entrance or Westbound exit
|-
|
|
| bgcolor="ffdddd" |3
| bgcolor="ffdddd" | - Cheadle, Wilmslow
| bgcolor="ffdddd" |No exits going Northbound or entrances from North
|-
|Gatley
|
|
| bgcolor="ffdddd" |4
| bgcolor="ffdddd" | - Chester, Warrington, Manchester Airport
| bgcolor="ffdddd" |No exit Eastbound or entrance Westbound
|-
|Wythenshawe
|4.5
|7.3
| bgcolor="ffdddd" |5
| bgcolor="ffdddd" | - Central Manchester, Didsbury, Chester, Warrington, Manchester Airport
| bgcolor="ffdddd" |No exits North or entrances from South going EastNo exits South or entrances from North going West
|-
|rowspan="3"|Sale
|6.0
|9.7
|6
| - Sale
|
|-
|6.8
|10.9
|7
| - Central Manchester, Stretford, Altrincham
|
|-
|7.5
|12.0
|8
| - Carrington
|
|-
|rowspan="2"|Urmston
|9.3
|15.0
|9
| - Trafford Park, Trafford CentreB5158 - Urmston
|
|-
|10.3
|16.5
|10
|B5158 - Trafford Park, Urmston
|
|-
|rowspan="2"|Eccles
|11.4
|18.4
|11
| - Eccles, Irlam
|
|-
|12.2
|19.7
|12
| - Liverpool, Warrington - Central Manchester, Salford
|
|-
|rowspan="3"|Worsley
|13.0
|21.0
|13
| - Swinton - Worsley, Leigh 
|
|-
|14.1
|22.7
| bgcolor="ffdddd" |14
| bgcolor="ffdddd" | - St. Helens, Leigh
| bgcolor="ffdddd" |Northbound entrance from East and Southbound exit going West only
|-
|
|
|15
| - Preston, Wigan, Bolton
|
|-
|Clifton
|16.3
|26.2
| bgcolor="ffdddd" |16
| bgcolor="ffdddd" | - Salford, Kearsley
| bgcolor="ffdddd" |No entrance Eastbound or exit Westbound
|-
|rowspan="2"|Whitefield
|18.5
|29.7
|17
| - Central Manchester, Prestwich, Whitefield
|
|-
|19.8
|31.8
|18
| - Leeds, Huddersfield - Bury, Burnley, Blackburn
|
|-
|rowspan="2"|Middleton
|21.0
|33.8
|19
| - Central Manchester, Middleton
|
|-
|22.6
|36.4
| bgcolor="ffdddd" |20
| bgcolor="ffdddd" | - Middleton, Blackley
| bgcolor="ffdddd" |No Westbound exit or Eastbound entrance
|-
|Whitegate
|24.7
|39.8
|21
| - Central Manchester, Rochdale, Chadderton
|
|-
|Failsworth
|26.3
|42.3
| bgcolor="ffdddd" |22
| bgcolor="ffdddd" | - Central Manchester, Oldham
| bgcolor="ffdddd" |No entrance North-Eastbound
|-
|Ashton under Lyne
|28.6
|46.0
|23
| - Ashton under Lyne - Ashton under Lyne
|
|-
|Denton
|30.6
|49.3
|24
| - Hyde, Sheffield - Central Manchester, Denton
|
|-
|rowspan="4"|Stockport
|
|
| bgcolor="ffdddd" |25
| bgcolor="ffdddd" | - Bredbury
| bgcolor="ffdddd" |no entrances to M60 South-Westbound
|-
|
|
| bgcolor="ffdddd" |26
| bgcolor="ffdddd" | - Stockport
| bgcolor="ffdddd" |No entrances or exits going EastNo exits to A560 going east or exits from A560 going west
|-
|
|
| bgcolor="ffdddd" |27
| bgcolor="ffdddd" | - Stockport
| bgcolor="ffdddd" |No South-Westbound exit or North-Eastbound entrance
|-
|36.1
|58.1
|colspan="3" align="center"|Motorway continues to junction 1

Coordinate list

{| border=1 cellpadding=2 style="margin-left:1em; margin-bottom: 1em; color: black; border-collapse: collapse; font-size: 100%;" class="wikitable mw-collapsible mw-collapsed"
|+
|- align="center" bgcolor="0080d0" style="color: white;font-size:120%;"
| colspan="5" | M60 motorway junctions
|- align="center" bgcolor="000000" style="color: white"
| mile
| km
| Anti-clockwise exits (B Carriageway)
| Junction
| Clockwise exits (A Carriageway)
|- align="center"
|0.0
| 0.0
| Stockport (West & Centre) A5145
| J1
| Stockport (West) A5145
|- align="center"
|1.5
|2.4
| Cheadle A560
| J2
|  No access (on-slip only)
|- align="center"
|
|
| Cheadle, Wilmslow A34
| J3
| Cheadle, Wilmslow A34
|- align="center"
|
|
|  No access (on-slip only)
| J4
| Chester, Warrington, Manchester , Birmingham (M6) M56
|- align="center"
|4.5
|7.3
| Chester, Manchester , Birmingham (M6) A5103 (M56)
| J5
| Manchester (C), Didsbury A5103
|- align="center"
|6.0
|9.7
| Sale A6144
| J6
| Sale A6144
|- align="center"
|6.8
|10.9
| Manchester (C), Stretford, Altrincham A56
| J7
| Altrincham, Manchester (C), Stretford A56
|- align="center"
|rowspan=2| 7.5
|rowspan=2| 12.0
| End of variable speed limit 
|rowspan=2| J8
| Carrington A6144
|- align="center"
| Carrington A6144
| Start of variable speed limit 
|- align="center"
|9.3
|15.0
| Trafford Park, Trafford Centre A5081
| J9
| Urmston B5158, Trafford Park A5081
|- align="center"
|10.3
|16.5
| Trafford Park, Urmston B5214
| J10
| Trafford Park B5214
|- align="center"
|11.4
|18.4
| Eccles, Irlam A57
| J11
| Irlam, Eccles A57
|- align="center"
|12.2
|19.7
| Manchester (C), Salford M602(M6), Liverpool M62
| J12
| Liverpool, Warrington M62Manchester (C), Salford M602
|- align="center"
|13.0
|21.0
| Swinton A572, Worsley A575
|J13
| Worsley, Leigh A575, Swinton A572
|- align="center"
|14.1
|22.7
| St. Helens, Leigh A580
| J14
|  No access (on-slip only)
|- align="center"
|
|
| (M6 North), Preston, Wigan, Bolton M61
| J15
| Preston, Wigan, Bolton M61
|- align="center"
|16.3
|26.2
| Salford, Kearsley A666
| J16
|  No access (on-slip only)
|- align="center"
|18.5
|29.7
| Manchester City Centre, Prestwich, Whitefield A56
| J17
| Whitefield, Prestwich A56
|- align="center"
|rowspan=2| 19.8
|rowspan=2| 31.8
| Start of variable speed limit 
|rowspan=2| J18TOTSO
| Burnley, Bury M66Leeds, Huddersfield M62
|- align="center"
| Leeds M62Bury, Burnley, Blackburn M66
| End of variable speed limit 
|- align="center"
|21.0
|33.8
| Middleton A576
| J19
| Manchester City Centre, Middleton A576
|- align="center"
|22.6
|36.4
|  No access (on-slip only)
| J20
| Middleton, Blackley A664
|- align="center"
|24.7
|39.8
| Rochdale, (A627(M)), Chadderton (A663)
| J21
| Manchester City Centre, Chadderton (A663)
|- align="center"
|26.3
|42.3
| Manchester City Centre, Oldham A62
| J22
| Oldham A62
|- align="center"
|28.6
|46.0
| Ashton-under-Lyne A6140
| J23
| Ashton-under-Lyne A635
|- align="center"
|30.6
|49.3
| Manchester City Centre, Denton A57, Hyde, Sheffield (M67)
| J24
| Denton A57, Hyde, Sheffield (M67)Manchester City Centre A57
|- align="center"
|
|
| Bredbury A560
| J25
| Bredbury A560
|- align="center"
|
|
|  No access
| J26
| Stockport (E&C) A560
|- align="center"
|
|
| Stockport (East) A560
| J27
|  No access (on-slip only)
|- align="center"
|36.1
|58.1
|colspan="3"|Motorway continues to J1
Data from driver location signs is used to provide distance and carriageway identifier information.

Incidents
On May 27, 2021, a car being chased by Greater Manchester Police deliberately drove the wrong direction on the motorway, colliding head-on with another car. Both drivers died. The accident triggered an investigation by the Independent Office of Police Conduct.

See also
List of motorways in the United Kingdom

References

External links

 CBRD Motorway Database - M60
Highways Agency - M60 Jct 5 to 8 (formerly M63 Jct 6 to 9) widening
Guide to the M60 Smart Motorway Construction

Further reading

Hyde, M., O'Rourke, A. and Portland, P. Around the M60: Manchester's Orbital Motorway. Altrincham: AMCD Publishers, 2004.

Motorways in England
Ring roads in the United Kingdom
Roads in Greater Manchester